Sportellidae is a family of marine bivalve molluscs of the superfamily Cyamioidea.

Sportellidae shells are of moderate size, equivalve and with an external ligament set on small nymphs. The hinge has one or two cardinal teeth and inconspicuous laterals.

Genera and species
 † Angusticardo Cossmann, 1887 
 Fabella Conrad, 1863
 Fabella constricta (Conrad, 1841)
 Fabella pilsbryi (Dall, 1899)
 Fabella stearnsii (Dall, 1899)
 Sportella Deshayes, 1858

References
 Powell A. W. B., New Zealand Mollusca, William Collins Publishers Ltd, Auckland, New Zealand 1979 
 Bieler, R.; Carter, J. G.; Coan, E. V. (2010). Classification of Bivalve families. pp. 113–133, in: Bouchet P. & Rocroi J.-P. (2010), Nomenclator of Bivalve Families. Malacologia. 52(2): 1–184.
 Coan, E. V.; Valentich-Scott, P. (2012). Bivalve seashells of tropical West America. Marine bivalve mollusks from Baja California to northern Peru. 2 vols, 1258 pp.

 
Bivalve families